Antonio Esposito (born 13 December 1972 in Lugano, Switzerland) is a Swiss-Italian former football midfielder who played throughout the 1990s and 2000s.

Career

Lugano
Esposito played his youth football in the youth department of FC Lugano. He played his debut in the December 1991, coming in as a substitute as Lugano won 3–2 against Lausanne-Sport. He signed his first professional contract in the summer of 1992 and joined Lugano's first team before the 1992–93 Nationalliga A season. He had seven league appearances and played in the Swiss Cup final as Lugano won 4–1 against Grasshopper Club to lift the trophy. Esposito then became regular player and stayed with the team for four years.

Grasshoppers
In 1996, Esposito signed for Grasshopper Club Zürich. Under head coach Christian Gross, Esposito played two seasons mainly in their starting eleven, winning the championship in the 1997–98 season. During this period, he also showed his goal scoring-abilities. However, then in the next season he lost his starting place, and he was used by new head coach Rolf Fringer only as joker. The club loaned him out to CD Extremadura for the second half of the 1998–99 season. After his loan period he returned to GC, now with head coach Roy Hodgson, for a further two season, winning the championship again in the 2000–01 season.

Cagliari and Saint-Étienne
In January 2001 Esposito signed with Italy's Cagliari Calcio in the Serie B. However, for the midfielder this was a disappointing time and Cagliari ended the 2000–01 Serie B season in the midfield 11th position. Just six months later, he moved to AS Saint-Étienne of France, playing their 2001–02 season in the French second division.

Basel
On 10 July 2002 it was announced that Esposito had signed a two year contract with Swiss double winners FC Basel. He joined Basel's first team for their 2002–03 season with head coach Christian Gross, under whom he had played by the Grasshoppers. After playing in one test game, Esposito played his domestic league debut for his new club in the away game on 17 July as Basel won 1–0 against Young Boys. He scored his first goal for his new team in the home game in the St. Jakob-Park on 3 August. Esposito was substituted in and in the second minute of added time he scored the last goal of the game as Basel won 4–2 against Servette.

Basel's 2002–03 UEFA Champions League season started in the second qualifying round. After beating Žilina 4–1 on aggregate and Celtic on the away goals rule after a 3–3 aggregate, Basel advanced to the group stage. They ended this in second position behind Valencia, but ahead of Liverpool and Spartak Moscow to advance to the second group stage. They ended this in third position behind Manchester United and Juventus, but ahead of Deportivo La Coruña. Esposito played in 10 of the 16 European games. Basel ended their league season as runners-up, but in the cup they advanced to the final and here they beat Xamax 6–0 to defend the title that they had won a season earlier.

In their 2003–04 league season the team started well, winning their first 13 matches straight out. The first defeat came on matchday 24. Basel won the championship.

However, Esposito's form had started to fade and head coach Gross left him on the bench more often than not. During the winter break Esposito decided  to retire from professional football and his contract was dissolved. In his eighteen months with the club Esposito played a total of 60 games for Basel scoring a total of seven goals. 29 of these games were in the Swiss Super League, three in the Swiss Cup, 11 in the UEFA competitions (Champions League and Europa League) and 17 were friendly games. He scored four goals in the domestic league and three in the cup.

Later years
In January 2004 Esposito joined A.S. Varese 1910 in the Serie C1, third tier of Italian football. At the end of the 2003–04 Serie C1 Varese suffered relegation. Esposito then joined FC Mendrisio in the third tier of Swiss football and six months later moved on to FC Lugano, who at this time played in the second tier. After six months he moved to AC Malcantone in the fifth tier.

International
Between 1997 and 2001 Esposito was called up into the Swiss national squad and played three international matches with them. He had played two games with the U-21 team earlier.

Honours
Lugano
 Swiss Cup: 1992–93

Grasshoppers
 Swiss Championship: 1997–98, 2000–01

FC Basel
 Swiss Cup: 2002–03
 Swiss Super League: 2003–04

References

Sources
 Die ersten 125 Jahre. Publisher: Josef Zindel im Friedrich Reinhardt Verlag, Basel. 
 Verein "Basler Fussballarchiv" Homepage

External links
 

1972 births
Living people
Swiss men's footballers
Switzerland international footballers
Swiss people of Italian descent
Swiss-Italian people
CF Extremadura footballers
FC Lugano players
Grasshopper Club Zürich players
Cagliari Calcio players
AS Saint-Étienne players
FC Basel players
Swiss Super League players
Serie B players
S.S.D. Varese Calcio players
Swiss expatriate footballers
Swiss expatriate sportspeople in Italy
Expatriate footballers in Italy
Expatriate footballers in Spain
Expatriate footballers in France
Sportspeople from Lugano
Swiss expatriate sportspeople in Spain
Swiss expatriate sportspeople in France
Association football midfielders